The Xplorair is a project of compact VTOL aircraft without rotating airfoil from aerospace engineer Michel Aguilar, funded by the French Armed Forces procurement agency DGA and supported by various European aeronautics firms such as Dassault Systèmes, EADS Innovation Works, MBDA, Altran Technologies, Sogeti, Turbomeca, COMAT Aerospace and the Institut Pprime. Announced in 2007, the project aimed to develop a UAV prototype scheduled for flight in 2017, followed by a single-seater flying car whose commercialization could occur the decade after.

The Xplorair is a personal air vehicle (PAV). The term "flying car" is often used by authors referring to the Xplorair project. While it is true that the vehicle has the same rough size as an automobile and is intended to be flown in the future above cities by anyone with a driver's license (thanks to a fully automated, SATS-like flight mode), it has no wheels and won't be driven on roads as a roadable aircraft like the Terrafugia TF-X. Another project of VTOL flying car that doesn't need roads is the Moller M400 Skycar. But unlike the Xplorair, the Moller skycar has rotating ducted fans powered by Wankel engines.

Xplorair PX200 

The PX200 (Personal Xplorair 200 km/h) is the single-seater Xplorair model currently in development. A  scale model of the Xplorair PX200 was exhibited at Paris Air Show 2013. A radio-controlled flying full-scale model, including a seat but still unmanned, was scheduled for take-off at Paris Air Show 2017. The first manned prototype should be ready before 2020, then certified and brought to market before 2030 at a public price between $60,000 and $120,000. Two-seater and four-seater models are also planned.

Main characteristics of the Xplorair PX200:

 Dimensions: 
 Dry weight: 
 Cruise speed: 
 Maximum speed: 
 Cruise altitude: 
 Range: 
 Fuel economy: 
 Use of biofuel from algaculture. Other fuels could be used, like kerosene, methane, hydrogen.
 Use of eco-friendly materials, in particular natural fiber (bamboo, linen…)

Early developments 

In 2002, French aerospace engineer Michel Aguilar, then 52 years old, retired from DGA to work as a full-time independent contractor on his Xplorair project, a VTOL aircraft where the common rotating airfoils (like propellers, rotors or ducted fans) are replaced by a new type of small jet engine directly fitted within wing's body, the thermoreactor. The aircraft would rely a lot on the Coandă effect for vertical take-off, increased lift and reduced drag.

A four-seater scale model was presented at Paris Air Show 2007. The year after, Aguilar founded the nonprofit organization Xplorair in order to gain expertise from specialized engineering consulting firms.

Thermoreactor jet engine

In 2011, Michel Aguilar's thermoreactor project received $2 million over three years in a subsidy from the Government of France through the Defense procurement agency DGA and the DGCIS of the Ministry of the Industry, under their RAPID award scheme supporting innovative technological projects of small and medium enterprises.

A consortium gathering Turbomeca, COMAT Aerospace and the Institut Pprime has been formed to evaluate the thermoreactor jet engine and develop the technology.

The thermoreactor is a small jet engine, ramjet-pulsejet hybrid. It uses a combustion at constant volume (isochoric) under the Humphrey cycle, whose thermal efficiency is greater (about 20%) than combustion at constant pressure (isobaric) of the Brayton cycle classically used in turbomachinery.

The combustion chamber is fed through a control valve and an inlet pipe by compressed air from a rotary vane pump aside in the fuselage, which extracts ambient air and moderately compresses it into a storage tank.

The thermoreactor has a square cross section and very compact dimensions. Thermoreactors are small enough to be fitted within wing's body as an array next to each other. Each thermoreactor develops a thrust of 170 newtons. The Xplorair PX200 includes 20 thermoreactors: 7 in each front wing, and 6 in aircraft tail. During take-off and landing, the 20 thermoreactors work together, providing 3,400 newtons of thrust.

Coandă effect and further developments 

In 2008 the project is first supported by Dassault Systèmes with the Passion for Innovation Program, EADS Innovation Works (the R&D department of Airbus) and MBDA. The project evolves in a single-seater aircraft with inverted V-tail nicknamed the Colibri because it would perform a vertical angled take-off like a hummingbird.

The exhaust gas temperature (EGT) of the thermoreactor using the Humphrey cycle being lower than in the conventional Brayton cycle by hundreds of degrees, the exhaust airflow out of the propelling nozzles at the trailing edge of the front wings can be directed onto the upper surface of the rear wings. The speedier airflow and the resulting Coandă effect around the curvature allow a higher lift coefficient and a smaller wingspan. This technique is quite similar to the blown wing used notably on the Breguet 941, Boeing YC-14 and Antonov An-72.

Xplorair is also supported since 2013 by Altran Technologies and Sogeti who develop the aerostructure and the avionics of the aircraft, now called the Xplorair PX200 (Personal Xplorair 200 km/h). Since the previous studies, aerodynamics evolved again with an upward V-tail and the use of the Coandă effect onto the upper surface of rear biplane tiltwings. During take-off or landing, these rear tiltwings rotate 90° and the leading edge of the lower rear wing connects to the trailing edge of the front wing, directly onto jet nozzles. The exhaust gas follows the curved surface due to the Coandă effect, and the slipstream is diverted downcast, providing powered lift for VTOL operation.

To avoid noise pollution, Sogeti also develops acoustic reflection techniques by shear rate modulation on jet. Reduction of about 15 dB, i.e. 30 times less sound power, is expected.

The Coandă effect is also used on the Xplorair to reduce form drag. While cruising, compressed air is injected as a radial jet at nose and leading edges, orthogonally to the ambient airflow, then covers the whole wetted area. This reduces the form drag, and could even make it negative with enough jet speed. This technique has been tested for the first time in 1918 by French physicist Constantin Chilowsky on shells, then various authors took over the idea to improve projectiles, including Henri Coandă for his own research on aerodynamics. This is why Aguilar refers to the "Chilowsky effect" rather than "Coandă effect" for this drag reduction scheme. This technique applied in air is similar to the submarine supercavitation technique used in some torpedoes like the VA-111 Shkval.

The PX200 aerostructure also allows for wing-in-ground-effect (WIG). The Xplorair could cruise at low altitude above seawater or special highways that would be built for such personal air vehicles, in order to reduce the lift-induced drag and thus improve the fuel efficiency.

In June 2014, Aguilar founds the private limited liability corporate entity ACG Aviation to develop the concept further.

Patents 

, Michel Aguilar filed 10 patents on the Xplorair and the thermoreactor:

See also
 Vertical take-off and landing (VTOL)
 Flying car (disambiguation)
 Personal air vehicle

External links
 Xplorair website
 ACG Aviation website
 
  (French), Altran, 19 June 2013

References

Experimental aircraft
Personal air vehicles